Donna Harris is an American politician who served as a member of the Indiana House of Representatives for the 2nd district from 2015 to 2016.

Early life and education 
Harris was born in Chicago and raised in East Chicago, Indiana. She graduated from Washington High School.

Career 
Harris was the president of the Indiana State Assembly Club. She was appointed to the Indiana House of Representatives on April 18, 2015, to replace her husband, Earl Harris. She left office in August 2019 and was succeeded by her son, Earl Harris Jr.

References 

Living people
People from Chicago
People from East Chicago, Indiana
Democratic Party members of the Indiana House of Representatives
Women state legislators in Indiana
African-American state legislators in Indiana
Year of birth missing (living people)
21st-century African-American people
21st-century African-American women